Helion Energy, Inc. is an American fusion research company, located in Everett, Washington. They are developing a magneto-inertial fusion technology to produce helium-3 and fusion power via aneutronic fusion, which could produce low-cost clean electric energy using a fuel that is derived exclusively from water.

History 
The company was founded in 2013 by David Kirtley, John Slough, Chris Pihl, and George Votroubek. The management team won the 2013 National Cleantech Open Energy Generation competition and awards at the 2014 ARPA-E Future Energy Startup competition, were members of the 2014 Y Combinator program, and were awarded a 2015 ARPA-E ALPHA contract, "Staged Magnetic Compression of FRC Targets to Fusion Conditions". In 2022, the company was one of five finalists for the 2022 GeekWire Awards for innovation of the year, specifically for fusion energy start up category.

Technology 
This system is intended to operate at 1 Hz, injecting plasma, compressing it to fusion conditions, expanding it, and recovering the energy to produce electricity. The pulsed-fusion system that is used is theoretically able to run 24/7 for electricity production. Due to its compact size, the systems may be able to replace current fossil fuel infrastructure without major needs for investment.

Fuel 
Deuterium and 3He allows mostly aneutronic fusion, releasing only 5% of its energy in the form of fast neutrons. Commercial 3He is rare and expensive. Instead Helion produces 3He by D-D side reactions to the deuterium - 3He reactions. D-D fusion has an equal chance of producing a 3He atom and of producing a tritium atom plus a proton. Tritium beta decays into more 3He with a half-life of 12.32 years. Helion plans to capture the 3He produced this way and reuse it as fuel. Helion has a patent on this process.

Confinement 
This fusion approach uses the magnetic field of a field-reversed configuration (FRC) plasmoid (operated with solid state electronics derived from power switching electronics in wind turbines) to prevent plasma energy losses. An FRC is a magnetized plasma configuration notable for its closed field lines, high Beta and lack of internal penetrations.

Compression 
Two FRC plasmoids are accelerated to velocities exceeding 300 km/s with pulsed magnetic fields which then merge into a single plasmoid at high pressure.  Published plans target compressing fusion plasmas to 12 Tesla (T).

Energy generation 
Energy is captured by direct energy conversion that uses the expansion of the plasma to induce a current in the magnetic compression- and acceleration- coils. Separately it translates high-energy fusion products, such as alpha particles directly into a voltage. 3He produced by D-D fusion carries 0.82 MeV of energy. Tritium byproducts carry 1.01 MeV, while the proton produces 3.02 MeV.

This approach eliminates the need for steam turbines, cooling towers, and their associated energy losses. According to the company, this process also allows the recovery of a significant part of the input energy at a round-trip efficiency of over 95%

Development history 
The company's Fusion Engine is based on the Inductive Plasmoid Accelerator (IPA) experiments performed from 2005 through 2012. These experiments used deuterium-deuterium fusion, which produced a 2.45 MeV neutron in half of the reactions. The IPA experiments claimed 300 km/s velocities, deuterium neutron production, and 2 keV deuterium ion temperatures. Helion and MSNW published articles describing a deuterium-tritium implementation that is the easiest to achieve but generates 14 MeV neutrons. The Helion team published peer-reviewed research demonstrating D-D neutron production in 2011.

4th prototype, 'Grande' 
In 2014, according to the timeline on the company website, Grande, Helion's 4th fusion prototype, was developed to test high field operation. Grande achieves magnetic field compression of 4 Tesla, forms cm-scale FRCs, and reaches plasma temperatures of 5 keV. Grande outperforms any other private fusion company. 

In 2015 Helion demonstrated the first direct magnetic energy recovery from a subscale pulsed magnetic system, utilizing modern high-voltage insulated gate bipolar transistors to recover energy at over 95% round-trip efficiency for over 1 million pulses. In a smaller system, the team demonstrated the formation of more than 1 billion FRCs.

5th prototype, 'Venti' 
In 2018, the 5th prototype, "Venti" had magnetic fields of 7T and at high density, an ion temperature of 2 keV. Helion detailed D-D fusion experiments producing neutrons in an October 2018 report at the United States Department of Energy's ARPA-E's annual ALPHA program meeting.

6th prototype, 'Trenta' 
In 2021, the firm announced that after a 16-month test cycle with more than 10,000 pulses, its sixth prototype, Trenta, had reached 100 million degrees C, the temperature they would run a commercial reactor at. Magnetic compression fields exceeded 10 T, ion temperatures surpassed 8 keV, and electron temperatures exceeded 1 keV.

7th prototype, 'Polaris' 
Helion's seventh-generation prototype, Project Polaris was in development in 2021, with completion expected in 2024. The device was expected to increase the pulse rate from one pulse every 10 minutes to one pulse per second for short periods. This prototype is the first of its kind to be able to heat fusion plasma up to temperatures greater than 100 million degrees C. Polaris is 25% larger than Trenta to ensure that ions do not damage the vessel walls.

8th prototype, 'Antares' 
, an eighth iteration, Antares, was in the design stage.

Funding 
Helion Energy received $7 million in funding from NASA, the United States Department of Energy and the Department of Defense, followed by $1.5 million from the private sector in August 2014, through the seed accelerators Y Combinator and Mithril Capital Management. 

In September 2020, the company was valued at 1.25 billion dollars. As of late 2021, investment totaled 77.8M. In November 2021, Helion received $0.5 billion in Series E funding, with an additional $1.7 billion of commitments tied to specific milestones. The funding was mainly led by Sam Altman.

Criticism 
Retired Princeton Plasma Physics Laboratory researcher Daniel Jassby mentioned Helion Energy in a letter included in the American Physical Society newsletter Physics & Society (April 2019) as being among fusion start-ups allegedly practicing "voodoo fusion" rather than legitimate science. He noted that the company is one of several that has continually claimed "power in 5 to 10 years, but almost all have apparently never produced a single D-D fusion reaction". However, Helion published peer-reviewed research demonstrating D-D neutron production as early as 2011 and according to the independent JASON review team, VENTI, a sub-scale prototype Helion developed partially for the ALPHA program, achieved initial results of   seconds energy confinement time and a temperature of 2 keV in 2018.

See also 
 Fusion Industry Association
 Fusion power
 General Fusion

References

External links 
 

Accelerator physics
Plasma physics
Nuclear physics
Nuclear fusion
Fusion power
Technology companies of the United States
Engineering companies of the United States